The yellow-throated garter snake (Thamnophis pulchrilatus) is a species of snake of the family Colubridae. It is found in Mexico.

References 

Reptiles described in 1885
Taxa named by Edward Drinker Cope
Reptiles of Mexico
Thamnophis